Sleepless Night is a 1960 Soviet drama film directed by Isidor Annensky.

Plot 
The film tells about the engineer who goes to Sibersk, where he becomes the head of a group of crane operators. He quickly masters a new job. And suddenly the city is visited by the bride of an engineer who works as an architect.

Cast 
 Yury Solomin as Pavel Kaurov, young engineer
 Evgeniy Samoylov as Pavel's father
 Lyudmila Chernyshyova as Pavel's mother
 Dzhemma Osmolovskaya as Annushka, Pavel's old flame
 Margarita Volodina as Pavel's current fiancee
 Aleksandr Grave as Petunin, Nina's former classmate
 Luiza Koshukova as Petunin's sister (as L. Koshukova)
 Gennadi Karnovich-Valua as Zubkov

References

External links 
 

1960 films
1960s Russian-language films
Soviet drama films
1960 drama films